Stephen Wong Yuen-shan (born 22 December 1975) is a Hong Kong policy researcher and politician who is the senior vice president of the Our Hong Kong Foundation, a non-profit organisation founded by the former Hong Kong chief executive Tung Chee-hwa, and also the executive director of the foundation's public policy institute. In 2021, he was elected as a member of the Legislative Council for the 1,448-strong Election Committee constituency which was newly created under the electoral overhaul imposed by Beijing.

Wong was appointed by Chief Executive John Lee as the inaugural head of the Chief Executive's Policy Unit on 27 December. He subsequently resigned from the Legislative Council.

Personal life 
In September 2022, Wong tested positive for COVID-19.

Electoral history

References 

Living people
1975 births
Hong Kong Christians
HK LegCo Members 2022–2025
Members of the Election Committee of Hong Kong, 2021–2026
Hong Kong pro-Beijing politicians